Jule F. Sumner High School is a public high school in Riverview, Florida. It opened in 2020 and was built to relieve overcrowding at East Bay High School in  Gibsonton and Earl J. Lennard High School in  Ruskin, though it also took some students from Joe E. Newsome High School in Lithia and from Durant High School in Plant City. The school is named after Jule F. Sumner, who was an early settler of the Southshore area.

Grades
Sumner High School serves grades 6 and 9-11 beginning in the 2020–21 school year. In the 2021–22 school year, the school will support grades 7 and 9–12. In the 2022–23 school year, the school will support grades 8–12. Beginning in the 2023–24 school year, Sumner High School will exclusively be a secondary school (grades 9–12). This is a part of the school's Academy 2027 program, to relieve overcrowding in middle schools in the area before a new one is built.

Athletics

Football
The Stingrays' field will be one of three in Hillsborough County to have an artificial turf field.

Tradition
Sumner High School's fight song is The New Colonial March by R. B. Hall.

Zoning
The boundary for current schools going to Sumner, which was formerly called "New High School TTT," is illustrated below.

References

High schools in Hillsborough County, Florida
Public high schools in Florida
2020 establishments in Florida
Educational institutions established in 2020